Charles Harrison Page (July 19, 1843 – July 21, 1912) was a U.S. Representative from Rhode Island.

Born in Glocester, Rhode Island, Page attended public schools. During the Civil War Page enlisted in the Union Army as a private at the age of nineteen in Company A, 12th Rhode Island Infantry, and was mustered out July 29, 1863. He resumed his studies in the Illinois State Normal School at Bloomington and at Southern Illinois College at Carbondale. He  returned to Rhode Island in 1869 and taught in a school in Scituate until the spring of 1870, when he enrolled at the law department of the university of Albany, New York. He graduated in 1871.
Page was admitted to the bar the same year and started his practice in Scituate, and in Providence, Rhode Island, in 1872. Later, he served as member of the State house of representatives in 1872 and 1873. He also served in the State senate in 1874, 1875, 1884, 1885, and 1890. 
He was an unsuccessful candidate for election in 1876 to the Forty-fifth Congress. He also contested for the post of attorney general in 1879. He served as a delegate to the Democratic National Conventions in 1880, 1884, and 1888. He also contested as a Democrat in the election of William A. Pirce to the Forty-ninth Congress, but the seat was declared vacant. Page was subsequently elected at a special election to fill the vacancy and served from February 21 to March 3, 1887.

Page was elected to the Fifty-second Congress (March 4, 1891 – March 3, 1893). He was reelected to the Fifty-third Congress at a special election (no candidate receiving a majority at the regular election), and served from April 5, 1893, to March 3, 1895. He served as a chairman of the Committee on Manufactures (Fifty-second and Fifty-third Congresses). He was not a candidate for renomination in 1894.

He resumed the practice of law until his death in Providence, Rhode Island, July 21, 1912. He was buried in the Swan Point Cemetery.

Sources

1843 births
1912 deaths
People from Glocester, Rhode Island
People of Rhode Island in the American Civil War
Democratic Party members of the Rhode Island House of Representatives
Democratic Party Rhode Island state senators
Albany Law School alumni
Illinois State University alumni
Southern Illinois University Carbondale alumni
Democratic Party members of the United States House of Representatives from Rhode Island
Rhode Island lawyers
19th-century American politicians
19th-century American lawyers